Olusegun Victor Akande  is a Nigerian politician and lawyer. He represents Ojo Constituency I in the 8th Legislative Assembly of the Lagos State House of Assembly since 6 August 2015 under the platform of the People's Democratic Party.

References

Living people
Yoruba politicians
Politicians from Lagos
Peoples Democratic Party (Nigeria) politicians
Yoruba legal professionals
People from Lagos State
Year of birth missing (living people)